Jelly d'Aranyi, fully Jelly Aranyi de Hunyadvár ( (30 May 189330 March 1966) was a Hungarian violinist who made her home in London.

She was born in Budapest, the great-niece of Joseph Joachim and sister of the violinist Adila Fachiri.  She began her studies as a pianist, but switched to violin at the Music Academy in Budapest when Jenő Hubay accepted her as a student. After concert tours of Europe and America as a soloist and chamber musician she settled in London. She formed a notable chamber trio with the Spanish cellist Pablo Casals and the Australian pianist Frederick Septimus Kelly, with whom she was in love, even referring to him as her "fiancé". On memorable occasions, she and Béla Bartók gave sonata recitals together in London and Paris. His two sonatas for violin and piano were dedicated to her; Jelly and Bartók presented them in London in March 1922 (No. 1) and May 1923 (No. 2).

She was an excellent interpreter of Classical, Romantic and modern music. After d'Aranyi had, at his request, played "gypsy" violin music to him one evening, Maurice Ravel dedicated his popular violin-and-piano composition Tzigane to her. Ralph Vaughan Williams dedicated his Concerto Accademico to her. Gustav Holst's Double Concerto for Two Violins was written for Jelly and Adila.  The D'Aranyi String Quartet is named after her. Her extreme talent bring to life one of the most intelligent parfumes from Bourjois "Printemps de Paris" invented by Constantin Weriguine in 1931.

She played a curious role in the emergence and 1937 world premiere of Robert Schumann's Violin Concerto. On the basis of messages she received at a 1933 séance, allegedly from Schumann himself, about this concerto of which she had never previously heard, she claimed the right to perform it publicly for the first time. That was not to be, but she did perform it at the London premiere.

From her 20s, Jelly d'Aranyi was a lifelong friend of Georgie Hyde-Lees, the wife of W. B. Yeats.

She died in Florence in 1966 aged 72.

References

External links 
 Jelly, Bartók and Ravel: "Gypsy fire" by Lawrence Budmen
 Jelly and Georgie Hyde-Lees: Ann Saddlemyer, Becoming George – The Life or Mrs W.B.Yeats
 Note on D'Aranyi String Quartet
 Vaughan Williams and Bartók compositions for d'Aranyi
 Holst's double concerto for Fachiri and d’Aranyi
 Jelly and the discovery of Robert Schumann's Violin Concerto in D minor, WoO 23, through a séance
 Photo of Jelly from 1933
 Kelly's lost Gallipoli sonata

Further reading 

 A Eaglefield-Hull (Ed), A Dictionary of Modern Music and Musicians (Dent, London 1924)
 Elkin, Robert, Queen's Hall 1893–1941 (Rider, London 1944), 51.
 MacLeod, Joseph, The Sisters d'Aranyi (London, Allen & Unwin, 1969).
 Magidoff, Robert, Yehudi Menuhin: The Story of the Man and the Musician (Robert Hale, London 1956).
 Kárpáti, János, Bartók's Chamber Music (Pendragon Press, Stuyvesant, NY, 1994)

1893 births
1966 deaths
20th-century Hungarian people
Hungarian classical violinists
Hungarian nobility
Hungarian expatriates in the United Kingdom
Hungarian expatriates in Italy
Musicians from Budapest
20th-century classical violinists
Women classical violinists
20th-century women musicians